Garnant railway station served the village of Garnant, Carmarthenshire, Wales, from 1840 to 1958 on the Brynamman Branch.

History 
The station was opened as Cwmamman in April 1840 by the Llanelly Railway. Its name was later changed to Garnant. An order was made on 14 December 1859 to close the branch line by the end of the month, although this didn't happen as it was still in Bradshaw and the timetable  from January to June 1860. It was resited half a mile to the west on 20 March 1865. It closed on 18 August 1958.

Garnant Halt 
They opened on 1 January 1908, closed on 2 April 1917 but reopened on 7 July 1919. They were temporarily closed on 11 April 1921 due to a coal strike but reopened on 1 July of the same year. They finally closed on 4 May 1926.

References 

 

Disused railway stations in Carmarthenshire
Railway stations in Great Britain opened in 1840
Railway stations in Great Britain closed in 1865
Railway stations in Great Britain opened in 1865
Railway stations in Great Britain closed in 1958
1840 establishments in Wales
1958 disestablishments in Wales